Gregorio de Alarcón, O.A.D. (1558 – August 1624) was a Roman Catholic prelate who served as Bishop of Santiago de Cuba (1624).

Biography
Gregorio de Alarcón was born in Castillo de Garcimuñoz, Spain in 1558 and ordained a priest in the Ordo Augustiniensium Discalceatorum on 22 December 1576.
On 29 April 1624, he was appointed during the papacy of Pope Urban VIII as Bishop of Santiago de Cuba.
In July 1624, he was consecrated bishop by Juan Bravo Lagunas, Bishop of Ugento. 
He served as Bishop of Santiago de Cuba until his death in August 1624.

References

External links and additional sources
 (for Chronology of Bishops)  
 (for Chronology of Bishops) 

17th-century Roman Catholic bishops in Cuba
Bishops appointed by Pope Urban VIII
1558 births
1624 deaths
People from the Province of Cuenca
Discalced Augustinian bishops
Roman Catholic bishops of Santiago de Cuba